Jacques Touchard (1885–1968) was a French mathematician. In 1953, he proved that an odd perfect number must be of the form 12k + 1 or 36k + 9. In combinatorics and probability theory, he introduced the Touchard polynomials. He is also known for his solution to the ménage problem of counting seating arrangements in which men and women alternate and are not seated next to their spouses.

Touchard's Catalan identity

The following algebraic identity involving the Catalan numbers

is apparently due to Touchard (according to Richard P. Stanley, who mentions it in his panorama article "Exercises on Catalan and Related Numbers" giving an overwhelming plenitude of different definitions for the Catalan numbers).
For n ≥ 0 one has

Using the generating function

it can be proved by algebraic manipulations of generating series that Touchard's identity is 
equivalent to the functional equation

satisfied by the Catalan generating series C(t).

Further reading 
  
Canadian Journal of Mathematics 1956, Vol 8, No 3.; Journal in French

French mathematicians
1885 births
1968 deaths
Place of birth missing
People from Basel-Landschaft